OS Fund is an American venture capital fund that invests in early-stage science and technology companies.

Firm

Bryan Johnson created OS Fund in October 2014, a year after selling Braintree to eBay for $800 million. He devoted $100 million from the sale of the mobile-payment processor to establishing the fund. Johnson and Jeff Klunzinger serve as the fund's general partners.

The fund draws its name from the acronym for operating system (OS), the software that underlies the basic functions of computers and provides a foundation for other applications. OS Fund focuses on investment in technologies and platforms in genomics, synthetic biology, computationally derived therapeutics, advanced materials, and diagnostics.

In September 2015, OS Fund published the methodology it uses to evaluate investments in the field of synthetic biology. In order to promote the brand, Johnson said the fund publicly released the "playbook" on its website to encourage others to invest in emerging sciences.

Origins

Johnson has said he launched the fund in response to a pullback in federal support of research and development, and because of a general reluctance by more traditional venture capital firms to make science-related investments. He also has spoken of a desire to use his resources to improve the lives of others.

Investments

OS Fund focuses on early-stage, computationally driven companies that utilize artificial intelligence and machine learning to develop platform technologies in the following sectors:

 Genomics
 Synthetic Biology
 Computationally Derived Therapeutics
 Advanced Materials
 Diagnostics

Notable OS Fund investments include the following:

Ginkgo Bioworks, a Boston-based biotechnology company that uses genetic engineering to produce bacteria with industrial applications; recently valued at $4.2 billion.
NuMat Technologies, pioneers of metal-organic frameworks that utilize high-performance computing to design material-enabled products.
Atomwise, a San Francisco-based developer of an AI-powered drug discovery platform.
Arzeda, a protein and enzymatic design platform used to develop transformative products across industries.
twoXAR, now rebranded as Aria Pharmaceuticals an AI-driven drug discovery platform.
Lygos, a biological engineering platform that converts low-cost sugar to high-value chemicals.
Tempo, a software-driven smart factory that merges data, analytics, and automation to rapidly and precisely print complex circuit board assemblies.
Truvian, a benchtop blood testing diagnostic system that provides lab-accurate results in 20 minutes.
Catalog, a Boston company focused on harnessing DNA to store data. The company recently showed it could store 14 gigabytes of data from Wikipedia.org in DNA molecules.
A-Alpha Bio, a drug discovery platform that simultaneously sorts through millions of protein interactions for multiple targets.
JUST, a San Francisco-based food technology company focused on sustainable plant-based food products, a 100% plant-based egg alternative made from mung beans.
Matternet, the builder and operator of drone logistics networks to transport goods on demand.  In 2019, they partnered with UPS to transport medical samples across hospital systems as well as UPS and CVS Pharmacy to make at-home prescription deliveries.

References

External links
Official website

Financial services companies established in 2014
American companies established in 2014
Venture capital firms of the United States